Mirjam Mous (born 7 November 1963) is a Dutch author of children's literature.

Early life and education
Mous was born 7 November 1963 in Oosterhout, Netherlands. She grew up in Made. Mous' father was a painter.

Mous studied to become a teacher in special education at the Pedagogische academie St. Frans in Breda.

Career
Mous worked as a special education teacher at De Berkenhof in Breda for 20 years before becoming a full-time writer.

She released her first book in 1998. This book was titled Monsters mollen!. It was swiftly followed by De juf is een heks.

Mous released many books before becoming a full-time writer, among which are Goed Fout! and Ouders te Koop. Doorgeschoten, based on the Columbine High School massacre, was released in 2004.

After she became a full-time writer in 2005, Mous continued to release many books. She also started two book series, De strandtent and Maffe Meiden.

In 2009, Mous published . This book would later be turned into a movie with the same title. The film would also be filmed in a German version.

Bibliography

References

1963 births
Living people
Dutch women children's writers
Dutch children's writers
People from Oosterhout
People from Breda